The Coalition for a Sustainable Brent Cross Cricklewood was formed following the submission in March 2008 of a planning application to the London Borough of Barnet by developers of the Brent Cross Cricklewood scheme in the Brent Cross area of north London.

The planning application area lies next to the border of Barnet with (on the other side of the A5 Edgware Road - the Roman road Watling Street) the London Borough of Brent.

Planning application

The submitted planning application is based around a "new town centre" on both sides of the A406 North Circular Road, mostly between the A5 Edgware Road in the west, and the A41 Hendon Way in the east.

It stretches south to parts of the Cricklewood area, and is based on a Barnet "Development Framework" report that also included West Hendon further north, but that area has since been developed independently.

'Membership'

The coalition comprises residential, environmental and transport groups which welcome redevelopment of this London Plan "Opportunity Area", but which have various reservations about the 'Development Framework' and with the subsequent planning application.

The coalition says it does not mandate its "interested parties", but works within an overall framework of opposition to environmental, transport and massing aspects of the plan (which is due to be completed over twenty years).

There is said to be no significant opposition to the principle of regeneration on the Brent Cross site. Many parties have stated that they welcome development, but take issue with:
 alleged environmental degradation (including aspects of a proposed waste processing facility)
 transport issues (notably around the Barnet Council figure of 29,000 extra cars per 12-hour working day (less a thousand or so accounted for by the now-separate West Hendon area)
 massing issues (including noise, light pollution, and overlooking of existing housing).

Concern has also been shown over the ability, or otherwise, of Barnet Council to effectively negotiate "Section 106 planning gain" finance (private-sector payments for public-sector works that mitigate planning effects). This is because, historically, Barnet has been intimately involved in the development of the Brent Cross scheme, which, it is alleged, means its independence to consider the planning application may have been compromised. The then leader of Barnet council stated in the Development Framework preface;

Interest in the coalition group is on an all-party and no-party basis, and has stimulated comment in the local press.

References

External links
Brent Cross shopping centre
Brent Cross Cricklewood regeneration website
Area Regeneration plan
Brent Friends of the Earth
London Group of the Campaign for Better Transport
London CBT response to plan

Geography of the London Borough of Barnet
Cricklewood